Július Hutka (born 18 March 1974) is a Paralympic former athlete from Slovakia competing mainly in category F57 shot put and javelin events.

Hutka has competed in the javelin three times in the Paralympics without winning a medal but he has won a bronze in the shot put in 2004 but could not match it in 2008.

Hutka worked as a builder, he went to Russia to do construction work. He fell from a height and damaged his spinal cord, he has been in a wheelchair since his serious accident.

References

Paralympic athletes of Slovakia
Athletes (track and field) at the 2000 Summer Paralympics
Athletes (track and field) at the 2004 Summer Paralympics
Athletes (track and field) at the 2008 Summer Paralympics
Paralympic bronze medalists for Slovakia
Living people
Medalists at the 2004 Summer Paralympics
1974 births
Paralympic medalists in athletics (track and field)
Slovak male javelin throwers
Slovak male shot putters
Sportspeople from Humenné
Wheelchair javelin throwers
Wheelchair shot putters
Paralympic javelin throwers
Paralympic shot putters